The Book of Us: Entropy is the third Korean-language studio album by South Korean band Day6. It was released by JYP Entertainment on October 22, 2019. The lead single "Sweet Chaos" was released the same day. The album debuted at number four on the Gaon Album Chart.

Background and release
On September 28, 2019, it was reported that Day6 would be returning with new music in October after fans discovered an advertisement at a subway station depicting Day6's logo with the date October 22 and the time 6 pm. Day6's agency JYP Entertainment later confirmed, "it is true that Day6 will come back on October 22". On October 6, 2019, a prologue film entitled The Book of Us: Entropy was released on Youtube. Pre-orders for the physical album opened on October 7, it became available in two versions: "Sweet" and "Chaos". On October 8, 2019, the tracklist was released, consisting of 11 new tracks. On October 10, individual "graphic image" teasers for each member were released. Following that, a series of individual and group photo teasers were revealed from October 11–20. The first music video teaser for the lead single "Sweet Chaos" was released on October 20 and an album sampler was revealed the following day.

Composition
Musically, the rock album incorporates several retro music genres including LA metal, disco, bossa nova and reggae. The lead single, "Sweet Chaos" has been described as a swing number that combines groove with punk rock. Talking about the album, Young K explained that The Book of Us: Entropy "features the process of changes a person's relationship with another person weaves." He further added, "The process is sometime heartwarming, but other times, it's chilling." Thematically, the album explores "the chaotic but dazzling entrance into a romantic relationship and chilling exit that follows."

Track listing

Charts

Accolades

Release history

References

2019 albums
Day6 albums
Korean-language albums